The Claridges Delhi is a five star hotel in New Delhi with 132 rooms. It is located in Lutyens' Delhi in the Dr APJ Abdul Kalam Road. Built in 1955, the hotel's interior depicts historical artwork of royal India and is surrounded with lush green lawns and has been an important relic of independent India.

The Claridges Delhi is spread across 3 acres of land, the hotel is a low-rise building of 3 floors and is divided into two wings. The hotel has an outdoor swimming pool, seven restaurants, a shopping arcade, health club and art galleries.

In 2003, the hotel's ownership was changed, which was arranged by its Chairman Suresh Nanda.

Restaurants

Sevilla 
Sevilla is a Spanish-themed restaurant in Claridges which serves pizzas, tapas, paella and house special sangrias.

Dhaba By Claridges 
Dhaba is a Punjabi highway themed restaurant in Claridges serving rustic Indian cuisine. Sanjeev Nanda, CEO of The Claridges Delhi sold the restaurant to Azure Hospitality in 2016.

Pickwick 
A multi-cuisine restaurant, Pickwick is a scenic beauty, with its colonial ambience, the world map of 18th century across the ceiling and the french windows added to which is an exclusive sushi bar and the Dickens Bar making it the perfect place to be.

Jade 
Inspired by jade, the ceremonial Chinese stone, this restaurant is admired for its delicious Chinese-Cantonese cuisine.

Aura- The Bar 
Setting the pace of the city's nightlife, Aura is an embodiment of chic and sophistication. Its dimly lit serene ambience makes it a perfect destination to unwind after a long day at work.

References 

New Delhi
Hotels in Delhi